Guillaume de Barrême de Châteaufort (6 January 1719, in Arles – 6 November 1775, in Arles), chevalier, was a French painter. He was descended from a converted Jewish family from Navarre which had moved to Arles under the doctor Salomon de la Rabissa (baptised as Jean de Barrême at the start of the 16th century and made a naturalised Frenchman in 1541). Guillaume married to Élisabeth de Campan in 1750 and had a daughter with her before leaving her around 1758 to live with Catherine Raspal, sister of his friend the painter Antoine Raspal. The couple had 4 children between 1760 and 1772, including the painter Jacques Réattu. Some years before his death Guillaume moved to Rome and was there received into a painting academy.

1719 births
1775 deaths
People from Arles
18th-century French painters
French male painters
18th-century French male artists